The Ailles rectangle is a rectangle constructed from four right-angled triangles which is commonly used in geometry classes to find the values of trigonometric functions of 15° and 75°.  It is named after Douglas S. Ailles who was a high school teacher at Kipling Collegiate Institute in Toronto.

Construction
When two such triangles are placed in the positions shown in the illustration, the smallest rectangle that can enclose them has width  and height . Drawing a line connecting the original triangles' top corners creates a 45°–45°–90° triangle between the two, with sides of lengths 2, 2, and (by the Pythagorean theorem) .

Derived trigonometric formulas
From the construction of the rectangle, it follows that

 
 
 
and

Variant
Its legs are each the hypotenuse of a 45°–45°–90° triangle, one with legs of length  and one with legs of length . The 15°–75°–90° triangle is the same as above.

See also 

 Exact trigonometric values

References

Triangle geometry
Types of quadrilaterals